This is a list of seasons completed by the Stanford Cardinal football team of the National Collegiate Athletic Association (NCAA) Division I Football Bowl Subdivision (FBS).

Stanford has participated in more than 1,100 officially sanctioned games, including 27 bowl games and has fielded football teams since 1892 with a few exceptions: the school dropped football in favor of rugby from 1906 to 1917 and did not field a team in 1918 (due to World War I) or in 1943, 1944, and 1945 (due to World War II).

Stanford claims two national championships: in 1926 and 1940.

From its inception through the 1930 season, the team had no formal nickname. Beginning with the 1931 season, the team adopted the mascot "Indian." The Indian symbol and name were dropped in 1972 after objections from Native American students. From 1972 to 1981, the official nickname was "Cardinals," a reference to the color, not the bird. Prior to the 1982 season, the team adopted the singular form, "Cardinal."

Seasons

References

Lists of college football seasons

Cardinal Football Seasons
Stanford Cardinal football seasons